Harold I. Goss (November 12, 1882 – May 25, 1962) was an American lawyer and politician who served as Secretary of State of Maine from 1942 to 1960.

Life
Harold I. Goss was born the son of Isaac W. and Elizabeth N. Wentworth Goss in Kennebunk, Maine. Goss was a lawyer and was in 1909 admitted to the bar. A  member of the Maine Republican Party, he was Secretary of State of Maine from 1942 to 1960. He is the longest serving Secretary of State in Maine history.

Goss was married to Ester LS Goss. He died on May 25, 1962. His grave is located in the Oak Grove Cemetery in Gardiner.

References

1882 births
1962 deaths
Maine lawyers
Secretaries of State of Maine
Maine Republicans
People from Kennebunk, Maine
People from Gardiner, Maine
20th-century American lawyers
20th-century American politicians